Justin Vaive (born July 8, 1989) is an American professional ice hockey player. He is currently playing with the Cincinnati Cyclones in the ECHL. His father is former National Hockey League All-Star right-winger Rick Vaive. Vaive was selected by the Anaheim Ducks in the 4th round (92nd overall) of the 2007 NHL Entry Draft.

Playing career
Vaive attended Ohio's Miami University, where he played four seasons (2007–2011) of NCAA college hockey with the Miami RedHawks men's ice hockey team.

On August 24, 2011, the San Antonio Rampage of the American Hockey League signed Vaive to an AHL contract. (AHL).

On July 24, 2014, Vaive re-signed to a one-year ECHL contract with the Greenville Road Warriors. Prior to the 2014–15 season on September 3, he was signed to return with Road Warriors AHL affiliate, the Hartford Wolf Pack, on a one-year deal.

On July 2, 2015, Vaive agreed to his first NHL contract as a free agent, signing a one-year, two-way contract with the New York Islanders. Vaive was unable to claim a roster spot with the Islanders and was reassigned to AHL affiliate, the Bridgeport Sound Tigers for the duration of the 2015–16 season.

With his rights not retained by the Islanders, Vaive went un-signed over the summer as a free agent before agreeing to return to the Cincinnati Cyclones of the ECHL on October 14, 2016. After appearing in the season opener, he accepted a professional try-out offer to return to the AHL with the Rochester Americans the following day.

Having captained the Cyclones for the previous two seasons, Vaive agreed to a contract extension in approaching his seventh year within the ECHL with the Cyclones for the 2020–21 season. However, the Cyclones opted to commence a hiatus due to the ongoing COVID-19 pandemic and he was immediately released as a free agent. On January 6, 2021, Vaive signed a contract to continue in the ECHL with the Fort Wayne Komets. Adding experience to the Komets forward group, Vaive added 18 points through 48 regular season games and 6 points in 13 playoff contests to help the Komets claim their first Kelly Cup in franchise history.

With the Cyclones returning to play for the 2021–22 season, Vaive returned to the club agreeing to a one-year contract on July 14, 2021.

Career statistics

Regular season and playoffs

International

Awards and honors

References

External links

1989 births
American men's ice hockey left wingers
Anaheim Ducks draft picks
Belleville Senators players
Bridgeport Sound Tigers players
Cincinnati Cyclones (ECHL) players
Fort Wayne Komets players
Greenville Road Warriors players
Hartford Wolf Pack players
Living people
Miami RedHawks men's ice hockey players
Rochester Americans players
San Antonio Rampage players